This is a list of yearly Northern California Athletic Conference football standings.

Northern California Athletic Conference standings

Far Western Conference standings

Northern California Athletic Conference standings

References

Standings
Northern California Athletic Conference
Northern California Athletic Conference football